Beanca Marie Binene (born November 4, 1997), professionally known as Bea Binene, is a Filipino actress and TV host. She was a finalist on StarStruck Kids and has played the role of Natalie Dimaculangan on First Time. She is also one of the Junior Ambassadors for the Haribon Foundation since 2005 and still an active volunteer of GMA Kapuso Foundation and the Philippine Red Cross. She is known for her role in GMA Network TV series Hanggang Makita Kang Muli.

She was in the GMA Network TV series Reel Love Presents: Tween Hearts playing the role of tough girl Belinda Fortes. She was also a regular host every Monday in Good News Kasama si Vicky Morales and Oh My Job on GMA News TV (now GTV).

Her first title role show with Jake Vargas was Alice Bungisngis and her Wonder Walis. She landed her second antagonist role in Carmela (2014) with Alden Richards and Marian Rivera.

She landed the role of being a feral child in the hit afternoon series Hanggang Makita Kang Muli opposite Derrick Monasterio which became hit in Peru. She landed the role of Anya in the sequel of Mulawin. She played a tabon, the daughter of Aviona and Rodrigo. She also played the role of Kitkat Bernardo on the primetime series, Beautiful Justice.

Personal life
Bea Binene was born as Beanca Marie Binene to a Chinese father and a Filipina mother of native Tagalog descent. Apart from her showbiz commitments, she is also an active wushu athlete with hopes of being able to play for the Philippine national wushu team in the future. She competed at the 2010 National Wushu Championships and earned a bronze medal. She is a certified PADI Open Water Scuba Diver. She is also a practicing Roman Catholic.

She took up Diploma in Professional Culinary and Pastry Arts at the Center for Asian Culinary Studies.

Her business, Mix and Brew Coffee located at the Foodcourt of SM Megamall closed because of the pandemic.

In 2022, Binene signed a contract with Viva Artists Agency. She was announced to be part of Viva Television's adaptation of The Rain in España, premiering in 2023.

Filmography

Film

Television

Radio

Discography

Studio albums

Awards and nominations

References

External links
 

1997 births
21st-century Filipino actresses
21st-century Filipino businesspeople
21st-century Filipino women singers
Actresses from Metro Manila
Filipino child actresses
Filipino child singers
Filipino film actresses
Filipino people of Chinese descent
Filipino Roman Catholics
Filipino radio personalities
Filipino television actresses
Filipino YouTubers
GMA Network personalities
Living people
People from Quezon City
PolyEast Records artists
StarStruck Kids participants
Tagalog people